Lepista irina is a species of fungus belonging to the family Tricholomataceae. It is a choice edible mushroom.

It has cosmopolitan distribution.

References

irina
Edible fungi